Age Out (formerly titled Friday's Child) is a 2018 American crime drama film directed by A. J. Edwards and starring Tye Sheridan and Imogen Poots.  Gus Van Sant served as an executive producer of the film.

Cast
Tye Sheridan as Richie
Imogen Poots as Joan
Caleb Landry Jones as Swim
Jeffrey Wright as Detective Portnoy
Brett Butler as Ms. LaField

References

External links
 
 

2018 films
2018 crime drama films
American crime drama films
2010s English-language films
2010s American films
Films scored by Colin Stetson